Dylan Guenther (born April 10, 2003) is a Canadian professional ice hockey winger for the Seattle Thunderbirds of the Western Hockey League (WHL) as a prospect to the Arizona Coyotes of the National Hockey League (NHL).  He was selected by the Coyotes with the ninth overall pick in the 2021 NHL Entry Draft.

Playing career 
The Edmonton Oil Kings selected Guenther with the first pick of the 2018 WHL Bantam Draft. He debuted with the Oil Kings late in the 2018–19 season, scoring three goals and four points in his first eight WHL games.

Guenther finished third on the Oil Kings in scoring in 2019–20, amassing 59 points (including a team-leading 26 goals) in 58 games. During the pandemic-shortened 2020–21 season, Guenther scored 12 goals and 24 points in just 12 games and was the only WHL player to achieve a 2.00 points-per-game rate.

The NHL Central Scouting Bureau ranked Guenther as the fifth-best North American skater eligible for the 2021 NHL Entry Draft. On July 24, 2021, the Arizona Coyotes selected Guenther with the ninth overall pick in the 2021 draft; the pick was acquired in a trade with the Vancouver Canucks. He was later signed to a three-year, entry-level contract with the Coyotes on August 31, 2021.

International play

 

On December 12, 2022, Guenther was named to Team Canada to compete at the 2023 World Junior Ice Hockey Championships. During the tournament he recorded seven goals and three assists in seven games. He scored two goals in the Gold Medal final game against Czechia, one being the winning goal in 3-on-3 overtime.

Career statistics

Regular season and playoffs

International

Awards and achievements

References

External links 

 

2003 births
Living people
Arizona Coyotes draft picks
Arizona Coyotes players
Canadian ice hockey forwards
Edmonton Oil Kings players
National Hockey League first-round draft picks
Seattle Thunderbirds players
Sherwood Park Crusaders players
Ice hockey people from Edmonton